Ali Rahmani (علی رحمانی) was born in Kashmar (25 May 1967). He was the first managing director of Tehran Stock Exchange. He is  professor  of accounting  at Alzahra University.

References

1967 births
Living people
People from Kashmar
Iranian businesspeople
Academic staff of Al-Zahra University